Green Lantern: 1001 Emerald Nights is an American comic book prestige format one-shot published in 2001 by DC Comics in that company's Elseworlds imprint. It is written by Terry LaBan with art by Rebecca Guay.

Plot

The story takes place in the Middle East and is based upon the folklore found in 1,001 Arabian Nights: "It is told that, long ago, the Sultan died, and his son, Prince Ibn Rayner, inherited the throne..."

So begins the incredible tale that blends the modern myths of Green Lantern with the ancient legends of The Arabian Nights, as the beautiful Scheherazade tells fantastical stories of a magic lamp, a jade-colored genie, and their owner, Al Jhor Dan.

References

Elseworlds titles
Green Lantern titles
Works based on One Thousand and One Nights
Comics based on fairy tales